The Quebec Government Offices (French: Délégations générales du Québec) are the Government of Quebec's official representations around the world. They are overseen by Quebec's Ministry of International Relations.

The network of 33 offices in 18 countries consists of eight general delegations, five delegations, thirteen government bureaux, five trade branches, and two areas of representation in multilateral affairs.

History
Quebec had agents-general in London, Paris, and Brussels prior to 1936, when legislation was passed by the government of Maurice Duplessis closing all Quebec government offices abroad. The government of Adélard Godbout repealed the legislation and opened an office in New York City in 1940. When Duplessis returned to power in 1944, his government retained the New York City office and its agent-general but opened no others. 

In the early 1960s, the government of Jean Lesage began to open additional offices abroad in Paris (1961), London (1962), Rome and Milan (1965). Subsequent governments opened offices in Chicago (1969), Boston, Lafayette, Dallas and Los Angeles (1970), Munich and Berlin (1971), Brussels (1972), Atlanta (1977), Washington, DC (1978), Mexico City and Tokyo (1980), Beijing and Santiago (1998), Shanghai and Barcelona (1999), Mumbai (2007), São Paulo (2008) and Moscow (2012). A UQAM scholar in 1984 called the offices "mini-embassies" for Quebec, and part of the Quiet Revolution.

In 1971, the title of agent-general was officially changed to delegate-general, although the previous title is still often used, particularly for the government's representative to London.

In 2019, the Government of Quebec was represented by 32 offices in 18 countries and had delegates-general (agents-general) in Brussels, Dakar, London, Mexico City, Munich, New York City, Paris and Tokyo; delegates to Atlanta, Boston, Chicago, Houston, Los Angeles, and Rome; and offices headed by directors offering more limited services in Barcelona, Beijing, Dakar, Hong Kong, Mumbai, São Paulo, Shanghai, Stockholm, and Washington. In addition, there were the equivalent of honorary consuls, titled antennes, in Berlin, Philadelphia, Qingdao, Seoul, and California's Silicon Valley. Québec also has a delegate for the Francophonie and Multilateral Affairs and a Representative to UNESCO, both based in Paris.

Quebec, like other Canadian provinces, also maintains representatives in some Canadian embassies and consulates general.

List of Quebec Government Offices 

Quebec Government Offices fall into several types. General Delegations are deemed most important, and handle affairs of economy, education, culture, immigration, and public affairs. Delegations are similar, but do not deal with immigration issues. Bureaus handle a small number of issues. Trade Offices deal with trade affairs. 

Source:

See also
Agent-general

References

External links
Quebec Government Offices
Quebec Government Offices – Ministry of International Relations
Historical overview of Quebec's international relations (archived)

Government of Quebec
Quebec
Quebec